Sir Thomas Brooke, 1st Baronet,  (31 May 1830 in Honley – 16 July 1908 in Huddersfield) was a British baronet.

Son of Thomas Brooke, of Northgate House, Honley, Yorkshire, and his wife Ann, daughter of Joseph Ingham, Brooke was a woollen merchant. He married firstly, in 1854, Eliza (d. 1855), daughter of Enoch Vickerman; their son, Francis Thomas, was born in 1855 and predeceased his father in 1872. He married secondly, in 1860, Amelia (d. 1901), daughter of David Dewar, of Dunfermline, Fife; his third wife was Mary (d. 1938), daughter of James Priestley, J.P., of Bankfield, Huddersfield, Yorkshire, and widow of Rev. Charles Farrar Forster. Brooke was also a Chairman of Quarter Sessions for the West Riding of Yorkshire and Commanding Officer of the 5th Administrative Battalion, Yorkshire West Riding Rifle Volunteer Corps.

References

People educated at Cheltenham College
British textile industry businesspeople
People from Honley
English justices of the peace
Baronets in the Baronetage of the United Kingdom
1830 births
1908 deaths
Wool trade
Deputy Lieutenants of the West Riding of Yorkshire